The Newark Adriatics, also known as the Adriatic Base Ball Club of Newark, was a member of the National Association of Base Ball Players before the American Civil War. The Adriatics first played another member in September 1857 and joined the NABBP for the 1858 to 1861 seasons.

Games
These are all the Newark Adriatics games listed somewhere by Marshall Wright (2000). For 1857, the game with the Union club of Morrisania, now in the Bronx, is the only listed match versus a non-member club (Adriatic), and the only listed match versus a club outside modern New York City. Only that spring, sixteen clubs within modern New York had convened for the first time, which was later recognized as initiating the Association.

References
Wright, Marshall D. The National Association of Base Ball Players, 1857-1870. Jefferson, North Carolina: McFarland & Company, Inc. 2000. 

National Association of Base Ball Players teams
1857 establishments in New Jersey
Defunct baseball teams in New Jersey
Baseball teams disestablished in 1861
Baseball teams established in 1857
Sports clubs disestablished in 1861